Solway is an old-established residential suburb near the Waingawa River in the south-western part of Masterton, the principal town in the Wairarapa Valley of New Zealand's North Island. It was a small part of Manaia run on which Masterton is built. It takes its present name from Solway House built in 1877 for W. H. Donald.

Solway College, a Presbyterian girls' boarding school, was established in Solway House in 1916 but Solway's central feature remains the near-moribund Masterton Agricultural & Pastoral Association's Solway Showgrounds opened in 1911. A Wairarapa Farmers Market  for artisan produce is held under the grandstand each Saturday morning. 

Solway also has several parks and reserves, including the Masterton Trust Lands Trust's Millennium Reserve built over the Acclimatisation Society's trout hatcheries and South Park, a softball field and dog-walking area.

History

Donald Donald (1854—1922) born at Manaia is reported to have said the original name for the area now known as Solway was Purātā, a Maori name for a flowering Rātā.

Solway House was a Donald homestead built in 1877 on part of Manaia, a 30,000 acre run owned by partners W. B. Rhodes and William Hodgson Donald (1815—1885), manager of the run. Donald married in England and came to New Zealand in 1842. He first established his family at Pencarrow then by 1849 became one of the first European farmers to settle in the Wairarapa. Wairarapa M.P.  Haddon Donald was a descendant. Until the time of the showgrounds when the name Solway seems to have been generally recognised the 1877 homestead's address was Solway House, Manaia.

W. H. Donald named Solway House after the Cumberland manor-house he was born and grew up in, the now-demolished Solway House on the banks of the Whampool River between Anthorn and Cardurnock. 

Manaia run or station stretched from the Waingawa to the Waipoua, where it met with Te Ore Ore station, and the original run grazed cattle on most of the Taratahi. Brenda Donald was the first pakeha woman born in Masterton at Manaia 12 July 1851. Barney Rhodes sold up 14,000 acres including some 1300 acres of freehold in 1859. Donald Donald kept the 640 acres from Kuripuni triangle to the river known as Solway and his elder brother, Rhodes Donald (1847—1917), kept an adjacent portion with the name Manaia. The original Manaia house burned down. Rhodes Donald built a new house but soon sold to John and George Judd. That part of Manaia Road was renamed Judd's Road.  The original Manaia woolshed built on the Waingawa side of what is now Judd's Road, the oldest pakeha building in Masterton, has been in Greytown's Cobblestones Museum since 1973 after a brief sojourn on the showgrounds. At Cobblestones the woolshed displays a Manaia invention and development, a Donald patented wool press. Made in both Perry Street, Masterton and Sydney NSW these presses were sent all over the world.

A new 80-lot subdivision received planning approval in September 2013.

Demographics

Solway had a population of 5,805 at the 2018 New Zealand census, an increase of 651 people (12.6%) since the 2013 census, and an increase of 882 people (17.9%) since the 2006 census. There were 2,241 households. There were 2,841 males and 2,967 females, giving a sex ratio of 0.96 males per female, with 1,182 people (20.4%) aged under 15 years, 1,143 (19.7%) aged 15 to 29, 2,403 (41.4%) aged 30 to 64, and 1,077 (18.6%) aged 65 or older.

Ethnicities were 83.7% European/Pākehā, 22.3% Māori, 4.3% Pacific peoples, 5.4% Asian, and 1.2% other ethnicities (totals add to more than 100% since people could identify with multiple ethnicities).

The proportion of people born overseas was 12.2%, compared with 27.1% nationally.

Although some people objected to giving their religion, 49.3% had no religion, 38.2% were Christian, 1.3% were Hindu, 0.6% were Buddhist and 2.5% had other religions.

Of those at least 15 years old, 519 (11.2%) people had a bachelor or higher degree, and 1,194 (25.8%) people had no formal qualifications. The employment status of those at least 15 was that 2,199 (47.6%) people were employed full-time, 723 (15.6%) were part-time, and 135 (2.9%) were unemployed.

Education

It is a boarding school founded in 1916.

Transport

Roads and bus services

Solway is served by many forms of public transport. State Highway 2 (or High Street), runs straight through the middle of Solway.

There are two bus services serving Solway:
200 – To/from central Masterton, Carterton, Greytown, Featherston & Martinborough. Runs all week.
202 – Travelling from Central Masterton through Solway and Kuripuni and back again. Runs 4 times daily on weekdays.

Rail services

 connects residents to the cities of Upper Hutt, Lower Hutt and Wellington. Its close proximity to Solway College makes it popular with its students, which board in Masterton and live in Wellington.

Hood Aerodrome

Hood Aerodrome is in Solway though as of 2015, there are no commercial flights from it. From early 2009 until late 2013 Air New Zealand provided flights to Auckland, operated by subsidiary Eagle Airways six days a week, mainly to serve business customers in the Wairarapa. There have been a few other unsuccessful attempts at commercial air travel in Masterton, mostly failing due to its proximity to major airports in Wellington and Palmerston North. The most significant was by South Pacific Airlines of New Zealand (SPANZ), which operated daily flights using DC3s during the sixties to destinations nationwide until the airline's closure in 1966.

Peter Jackson is an avid aviation enthusiast and owns a collection of over 40 flyable World War I-era warbirds housed at Solway's Hood Aerodrome.

Notes

References

External links
 Solway

Suburbs of Masterton